14 Megala Tragoudia (Greek: 14 μεγάλα τραγούδια; English: 14 great songs) is a compilation album by popular Greek singer Despina Vandi containing some of her most successful singles under the EMI Music Greece label (with whom she was signed from her debut in 1994 until 2000). It was part of a CD collection with the general title 14 Megala Tragoudia.

Track listing

Release history

Credits and personnel

Personnel
Vasilis Karras – music, lyrics
Tony Kontaxakis – music, lyrics
Phoebus – music, lyrics
Despina Vandi – vocals

Production
Panos Bothos – sound field
Haris Tsakmatsian – repertoire selection

Credits adapted from the album's liner notes.

References

External links
 Official site

2006 compilation albums
Despina Vandi compilation albums
Greek-language compilation albums
Minos EMI compilation albums